TV-SAT 1 or TVSAT-1 was a West German communications satellite, which was to have been operated by Deutsche Bundespost. It was intended to provide television broadcast services to Europe, but it failed before entering service. It was built by Aérospatiale, was based on the Spacebus 300 satellite bus, and carried five Ku-band transponders.

Launch 
TV-SAT 1 was launched by Arianespace using an Ariane 2 rocket flying from ELA-2 at Centre Spatial Guyanais, Kourou, French Guiana. The launch took place at 02:19:00 UTC on 21 November 1987. It was the first Spacebus 300 satellite to be launched. Immediately after launch, one of its solar panels failed to deploy, so that the main uplink antenna, behind the solar panel, could not deploy either. This failure was caused by the presence of two hold-down bolts, which should have been removed before launch.

Mission 
Despite the failure, TV-SAT 1 was placed into a geostationary orbit at a longitude of 19.2° West. It was briefly used for a series of tests to verify the satellite's systems, before it was retired to a graveyard orbit in February 1988.

TV-Sat 2 followed on 8 August 1989.

See also 

 1987 in spaceflight

References 

1987 in spaceflight
Spacecraft launched in 1987
Satellites using the Spacebus bus